Curtis Jay Clawson (born September 28, 1959) is an American politician who served as the United States representative for Florida's 19th congressional district from 2014 to 2017. He is the former chief executive of Hayes Lemmerz, a Michigan-based automobile wheel and brakes supplier.

Early life and education 
Clawson attended Batesville High School in Batesville, Indiana. A high school basketball star, he was recruited by Gene Keady. At Purdue, he was a 2× All-Academic Big Ten selection (1982–83 and 1983–84). He was a team captain for the 1983–84 Big Ten Champions, was a member of 2× NCAA teams (1982–83 and 1983–84) and an NIT Finalist team (1981–82). He graduated in 1984 with a BA in Spanish and a BS from the Krannert School of Management. He was named a "Purdue Old Master" in 2010 and received the Distinguished Alumni Award in 2014.

In 1990, he earned an MBA from Harvard University.

U.S. House of Representatives

Elections
2014 special

Clawson was the Republican Party nominee in a special election to fill the seat being vacated by Trey Radel. and won the election on June 24, 2014. In the April 22, 2014 Republican primary—the real contest in this heavily Republican district—Clawson defeated State Senate Majority Leader Lizbeth Benacquisto and former State Representative Paige Kreegel with 38% of the vote to Benacquisto's 26% and Kreegel's 25%.  Clawson was endorsed in the primary by the Tea Party Express.  He spent $2 million on advertising and in one of his ads he challenged U.S. President Barack Obama to a game of one on one basketball.

2014 general

Clawson won a full term in November 2014 with 64 percent of the vote.

Tenure
Clawson delivered the Tea Party response to President Obama's State of the Union Address in 2015.

In May 2016, Clawson announced that he would not seek re-election that year, citing his desire to support his father in the aftermath of his mother's death the previous year.

Clawson was a member of the Congressional Constitution Caucus.

Electoral history

2014 (special)

2014

References

External links

 
 
 

|-

1959 births
Latter Day Saints from Indiana
Businesspeople from Florida
Harvard Business School alumni
Living people
People from Batesville, Indiana
People from Bonita Springs, Florida
Purdue Boilermakers men's basketball players
Republican Party members of the United States House of Representatives from Florida
Latter Day Saints from Florida
21st-century American politicians
American men's basketball players
Conservatism in the United States